Haissa Ali Garba (born 15 December 1981) is a Nigerien sprinter. She competed in the women's 400 metres at the 2000 Summer Olympics.

References

External links
 

1981 births
Living people
Athletes (track and field) at the 2000 Summer Olympics
Nigerien female sprinters
Olympic athletes of Niger
Place of birth missing (living people)
Olympic female sprinters